Karen Nadine Scott is a New Zealand Law academic. She is a full professor at the University of Canterbury. She was elected President of the Australian and New Zealand Society of International Law in June 2019.

Academic career

After an LLBa and an MLaws at the University of Nottingham, she lectured at Nottingham before moving to the University of Canterbury, where she rose to full professor  and head of school. Canterbury was the first law school to have both a female dean (Ursula Cheer) and head of school (Scott).

Scott's research interests include antarctic law, the law of the sea, environmental law and international trade law.

Selected works 
 Rothwell, Donald, Alex G. Oude Elferink, Karen N. Scott, and Tim Stephens, eds. The Oxford handbook of the law of the sea. Oxford Handbooks in Law, 2015.
 Hemmings, Alan D., Donald R. Rothwell, and Karen N. Scott, eds. Antarctic security in the twenty-first century: legal and policy perspectives. Routledge, 2012.
 Scott, Karen N. "International law in the anthropocene: responding to the geoengineering challenge." Michigan Journal of International Law 34 (2012): 309.
 Scott, Karen N. "International regulation of undersea noise." International & Comparative Law Quarterly 53, no. 2 (2004): 287–323.
 Scott, Karen N. "Tilting at offshore windmills: regulating wind farm development within the renewable energy zone." Journal of Environmental Law 18, no. 1 (2005): 89–118.

References

Living people
Year of birth missing (living people)
Academic staff of the University of Canterbury
New Zealand women academics